Nkompo Festival is an annual festival celebrated by the chiefs and peoples of Acherensua-Asutifi in the Ahafo region, formally Brong Ahafo Region of Ghana. It is usually celebrated in the month of January. Others also claim it is celebrated in September.

Celebrations 
During the festival, visitors are welcomed to share food and drinks. The people put on traditional clothes and there is durbar of chiefs. There is also dancing and drumming.

Significance 
This festival is celebrated to mark an event that took place in the past.

References 

Festivals in Ghana
Ahafo Region